Part III of the Mathematical Tripos (officially Master of Mathematics/Master of Advanced Study) is a one-year Masters-level taught course in mathematics offered at the Faculty of Mathematics, University of Cambridge. It is regarded as one of the hardest and most intensive mathematics courses in the world. Roughly one third of the students take the course as a fourth year of mathematical study at Cambridge after Parts IA, IB, and II of the Mathematical Tripos, whilst the remaining two thirds take the course as a one-year course.

History
The Smith's Prize Examination was founded by bequest of Robert Smith upon his death in 1768 to encourage the study of more advanced mathematics than that found in the undergraduate course. T. W. Körner notes

In 1883 this was replaced by an exam called Part III and the Smith's Prize awarded for an essay rather than examination. In 1886 this exam was renamed Part II, and later in 1909 Part II, Schedule B. In 1934 it was again renamed Part III.

In the 1980s the Certificate of Advanced Study in Mathematics was introduced; for those students successfully completing Part III of the Mathematical Tripos in Easter Term 2011 CASM was replaced by two new degrees, the Master of Mathematics (M.Math.) and Master of Advanced Study (M.A.St.). All who have passed the course since 1962 are entitled to these new degrees. The first retrospective M.Math and M.A.St. degrees were conferred as part of a celebration of the University's 800th anniversary. The course is often still referred to as Part III.

Master of Mathematics vs Master of Advanced Study
Students who have completed their undergraduate degree at Cambridge will be awarded both a Bachelor of Arts (B.A.) and the Master of Mathematics (M.Math.) degree for four years of study, provided they have not previously graduated with a B.A. This allows Cambridge graduates to remain eligible for government funding for the course. Progression from Part II of the Mathematical Tripos to Part III normally requires either a first in Part II or very good performances in Parts IB and Part II. 
Students who complete Part III of the Mathematical Tripos, but did not complete undergraduate studies at Cambridge (or have previously graduated with a B.A.) will be awarded the Master of Advanced Study (M.A.St.) in Mathematics degree for the one-year course.

The program previously resulted in a Certificate of Advanced Study in Mathematics instead of a Master's degree.

Current course structure
The course lasts one year, divided into three eight-week terms. There are a wide variety of lectures on both pure and applied maths, mostly concentrated in the first two terms. The third term is primarily for examinations (and revision for said examinations) which, together with the option of writing a part III essay (introduced in the 1970s, a miniature thesis of sorts, often in the form of a literature review), determine one's final grade entirely.

Grading

The grades available are Fail, Pass (Honours), Merit, and Distinction (the Merit grade was introduced in 2000).  Cambridge recognises that in Part III of the mathematical tripos a merit is equivalent to a First Class in the other parts of the Tripos. The level of achievement required for a distinction is yet higher.
Traditionally, results are announced in the University's Senate House. Standing on the balcony, the examiner reads out the class results for each student, and printed copies of the results are then thrown to the audience below. The students' exact rankings are no longer announced, but the highest-ranked student is still identified, nowadays by the tipping of the examiner's academic hat when the relevant name is read out.

Prizes

In addition to the grades, there are six associated prizes. Five of these may be awarded at the discretion of the examiners: the Mayhew Prize for applied mathematics, the Tyson Medal for mathematics and astronomy, the Bartlett Prize for applied probability, the Wishart Prize for statistics and the Pure Mathematics Prize for pure mathematics. Several notable astronomers and astrophysicists have been awarded the Tyson Medal in the history of Part III maths, including Jayant Narlikar, Ray Lyttleton and Edmund Whittaker. In addition, the Thomas Bond Sprague Prize
is awarded by the Rollo Davidson Trust for distinguished performance in actuarial science, 
finance, insurance, mathematics of operational research, probability, risk
and statistics.

References

Faculty of Mathematics, University of Cambridge
Mathematics education in the United Kingdom